Eurorails is a board game published by Mayfair Games in 1990.

Gameplay
Eurorails is a strategy game about trains.

Publication history
A number of spin-off games for Empire Builder have been released, expanding the game's geography to other countries (British Rails, Eurorails, Australian Rails, Russian Rails, etc.).

Reception
Eurorails won the Origins Award for Best Modern-Day Boardgame of 1990.

Reviews
Strategy Plus
1991 Games 100 in Games #106 (Vol 15, #4) in December 1991

References

External links
 

Board games introduced in 1990
Mayfair Games games
Origins Award winners